Endotricha shafferi is a species of snout moth in the genus Endotricha. It is found in China (Guangxi).

The wingspan is about 21 mm. The forewings are blackish brown in males and black in females. The hindwings are black.

Etymology
This species is named after Michael Shaffer for his outstanding work in the taxonomy of Pyraloidea.

References

Moths described in 2012
Endotrichini